1 Timothy 1 is the first chapter of the First Epistle to Timothy in the New Testament of the Christian Bible. The author has been traditionally identified as Paul the Apostle since as early as AD 180, although most modern scholars consider the letter pseudepigraphical, perhaps written as late as the first half of the second century AD.

This chapter opens the letter with a personal greeting or salutation, and covers an exposition about the gospel and its counterfeit, Paul's personal experience of Christ, and a charge as well as a warning to Timothy related to his call to the ministry.

Text
The original text was written in Koine Greek. This chapter is divided into 20 verses.

Textual witnesses
Some early manuscripts containing the text of this chapter are:
Codex Sinaiticus (330–360)
Codex Alexandrinus (400–440)
Codex Freerianus (c. 450; extant verses 1–3, 10–13, 19–21)
Codex Claromontanus (c. 550)
Codex Coislinianus (c. 550; extant verses 7–20)
Uncial 0262 (7th century; extant verses 15–16)

The Salutation (1:1–2)
The letter starts with a 'traditional Hellenistic salutation', using an "X to Y" pattern, so the reader would immediately see the identity of the sender as well as of the recipient once the scroll is unrolled. The Pauline epistles generally use the typical elements: the designation of the sender and of the recipient, followed by a greeting.

Verse 1
Paul, an apostle of Jesus Christ by the commandment of God our Saviour, and the Lord Jesus Christ, which is our hope,
"Saviour (KJV; NKJV: "Savior";): The first of three times in this letter (others: 2:3; 4:10) that God is called "Savior", recalling the 'well-known appellation of Yahweh in the Greek Old Testament' (for examples, LXX ; ; ; ; ; Isaiah 12:2; ;).

Verse 2
Unto Timothy, my own son in the faith: Grace, mercy, and peace, from God our Father and Jesus Christ our Lord.
"Timothy": Paul's convert, originally of Lystra (Acts 16:1) with a Jewess mother, Eunice, an unnamed Greek father and a grandmother named Lois (2 Timothy 1:5).
"My own son" or "my true son" (Greek:) Vulgate Latin reads: "beloved son" (dilecto filio). Tradition states that Timothy died in the year 93 AD, so if the letter was written in the first half of the second century AD, as some scholars maintain, it was not sent to Timothy personally.
 "Grace, mercy, and peace": While "grace" and "peace" appear in typical Pauline epistles (etc.), the addition of "mercy" is only found in the 'Pastoral Epistles' (the epistles to Titus, 1 and 2 Timothy; cf. Titus 1:4; 2 Timothy 1:2).

The Gospel and its counterfeits (1:3–11)
Paul once left Timothy at Ephesus with a particular task, to command others not to teach false doctrines, which already circulated at quite an early stage of the church's life; 'a reminder that in every age truth is challenged by counterfeits'.

Verses 3–4
 As I urged you when I was going to Macedonia, remain at Ephesus so that you may charge certain persons not to teach any different doctrine,  nor to devote themselves to myths and endless genealogies, which promote speculations rather than the stewardship from God that is by faith.
Paul left Timothy behind in Ephesus, as he himself traveled into Macedonia, to instruct people not to follow false teaching, which characteristic is the devotion to 'myths and endless genealogies which promotes speculations' (verse 4), pointing to a sort of 'Gnostic group' in the community which perverts the faith by mythological speculations about creation and salvation. The opponents are not specifically identified, but the focus is more to combat it with a view of Christian virtues such as love out of a pure heart, and a good conscience (verse 5) against 'the vices of speculative theory and vain discussion'. 
"Stewardship" or "good order"

Verse 5
But the aim of such instruction is love that comes from a pure heart, a good conscience, and sincere faith.
The nature of Timothy's task is to produce love (agapē) and the nourishing of it through purity, a good conscience and faith. Protestant theologian Heinrich Meyer recalls that "it is often remarked" that love must come from a pure heart, for example 1 Peter 1:22 enjoins "love ... with a pure heart, but "a good conscience, and .. sincere faith" (καὶ συνειδήσεως ἀγαθῆς καὶ πίστεως ἀνυποκρίτου) are added here "with special reference to the heretics, who are reproached with having both an evil conscience and a pretended faith" (see verse 19).

Verses 6–7
Some people have deviated from these and turned to meaningless talk, desiring to be teachers of the law, without understanding either what they are saying or the things about which they make assertions.
Paul draws attention to those who promotes the false teaching (the opposite of true faith) leading to unproductiveness — they are unsuitable to be teachers in their lack of meaning.

Verse 8
But we know that the law is good if one uses it lawfully,
 "law" (Greek:); "lawfully" (Greek:): The "law" must be used "lawfully" or "legitimately", that is with the understanding of its purpose: the "function of the law in the lives of those who have been saved by grace". In this passage, Paul describes the actions that are contrary to the law, but not in "personal debauchery" (as in ) but "in opposition to God" (1 Timothy 1:9a) and "in hostility to human beings" (1 Timothy 1:9b-10a), which show love to "neither God nor neighbor".

Verse 9
Knowing this, that the law is not made for a righteous man, but for the lawless and disobedient, for the ungodly and for sinners, for unholy and profane, for murderers of fathers and murderers of mothers, for manslayers,
 "the lawless" (Greek:) 
Vincent defines it as "recognizing no law" rather than "not having a law".
 "made" (Greek:) has a legal sense, which can also be rendered "given, exist, be valid". 
This verse establishes that "the law has been made" not for the righteous but for "lawless/lawbreakers" and "disobedient/rebels"; the law is not applicable to the righteous as some heretics try to force it into "a doctrinal or ethical role it was not intended to have". The law functions as a kind of "vice list" to "point out sin in whatever form it may take in a given culture", exposing the false teachers who are misusing it. The "vice list" not only recalls the lists found in ancient moralistic writings, but follows the topics in the "Ten Commandments", as in the following table:

Verse 10
For whoremongers, for them that defile themselves with mankind, for menstealers, for liars, for perjured persons, and if there be any other thing that is contrary to sound doctrine;
 "whoremongers" (Greek:)
Also translated in various bible versions as "fornicators". "adulterers" or "sexually immoral people", was understood (as was the seventh commandment) as applying to various acts of sexual immorality. Nevertheless, the Hebrew  in  specifically meant "adultery" (another word, was used for fornication in general), and at the time of the New Testament is rendered as the Greek word , which was broadly used for sexual immorality.
 "for them that defile themselves with mankind" or "sodomites" (Greek:)
The Greek word  has been translated into English in different ways, among others, "abusers of themselves with men" (1901 American Standard Version), "them that defile themselves with mankind," (Authorized Version 1873), "sodomites" (RSV 1901), and "perverts" (NIV 1973).  The word occurs only two times in the New Testament: 1 Corinthians 6:9 and 1 Timothy 1:10.
 "sound" (Greek:)
This word is a medical term, related to "hygiene". Paul uses it here as a "metaphor that contrasts healthy doctrine with the sickly, unhealthy teaching of the heretics".

The Thanksgiving (1:12–17)

Verse 15
This is a faithful saying and worthy of all acceptance, that Christ Jesus came into the world to save sinners, of whom I am chief.
"This is a faithful saying" (Greek:): is a formula assuming 'general acceptance' and is stated 5 times in the Pastoral Epistles (1 Timothy 1:15; 3:1; 4:9; 2 Timothy 2:11; Titus 3:8).
"Christ Jesus came into the world to save sinners": The 'central Christian belief' is given an example of Paul himself as a 'prototype believer and recipient of grace', who was saved while being a sinner.

Prior Examples (1:18–20)

Verse 20
of whom are Hymenaeus and Alexander, whom I delivered to Satan that they may learn not to blaspheme.
"Hymenaeus": only mentioned here and in 2 Timothy 2:17.

See also

 Ephesus
 Jesus Christ
 Macedonia
 Paul of Tarsus
 Timothy
 Related Bible parts: Acts 20

References

Sources

External links
 King James Bible - Wikisource
English Translation with Parallel Latin Vulgate
Online Bible at GospelHall.org (ESV, KJV, Darby, American Standard Version, Bible in Basic English)
Multiple bible versions at Bible Gateway (NKJV, NIV, NRSV etc.)
 1 Timothy 1:18-19 NIV Christian podcast episode

01